Mohammadabad-e Deh Gavi (also Romanized as Moḩammadābād-e Deh Gāvī; also known as Mohammad Ābād and Moḩammadābād-e Deh Gārī) is a village in Chahdegal Rural District, Negin Kavir District, Fahraj County, Kerman Province, Iran. At the 2006 census, its population was 619, in 165 families.

References 

Populated places in Fahraj County